Oak Hill Capital Partners is a private equity firm headquartered in New York City, with more than $19 billion of committed capital from entrepreneurs, endowments, foundations, corporations, pension funds and global financial institutions. Robert Bass is the lead investor.

Oak Hill Capital is one of several Oak Hill partnerships, each of which has an independent management team. These Oak Hill partnerships comprise over $18 billion of investment capital across multiple asset classes, including private equity, special situations, high yield and bank debt, venture capital, real estate and a public equity exchange fund.

On April 20, 2010 the company announced acquisition of Denver-based data center company ViaWest Inc. for an undisclosed amount.

In 2017 the company sold Wave Broadband for more than $2.3 billion.

Notable investors
Robert Bass, who was an early investor in leveraged buyouts in the 1980s and employed David Bonderman and Jim Coulter the founders of Texas Pacific Group, is the lead investor in Oak Hill Capital Partners.

The company has garnered widespread media attention due to its addition of investors Bill Gates and Nike founder Phil Knight.

Other investors include the Country of Singapore and Stanford University.

Notable investments
Over a period of nearly twenty years, Oak Hill Capital has invested in more than fifty significant private equity transactions, including:
 Imagine Group
 Ariel
 Atlantic Broadband
 Genpact 
 The Container Store
 Butler Animal Health Supply
 EXL Service
 Progressive Moulded Products
 TravelCenters of America
 WideOpenWest
 Blackboard Inc.
 American Savings Bank (Washington Mutual)
 Bell & Howell (ProQuest)
 Oreck Corporation
 Vertex Data Science
 eGain 
Wometco Cable Corporation
 MetroNet
 Alibris
 Dave & Buster's
 Local TV LLC
 Checkers and Rally's
Safe Fleet
Invisalign
Burger King
Vexus Fiber
Omni Fiber
GoNetSpeed
Financial Engines

Recent acquisitions
In October 2014, Oak Hill Capital Partners acquired Berlin Packaging for a fee of $1.43 billion from Investcorp.

In January 2018, Oak Hill Capital Partners acquired Safe Fleet from The Sterling Group. No value of the deal was mentioned.

On June 15, 2018, Oak Hill Capital Partners acquired a majority stake in VetCor Group Holdings Corp. Terms of the transaction were not disclosed.

Investment professionals

Managing Partners
Tyler Wolfram
Brian Cherry
Steven Puccinelli

Partners
Scott Baker
Benjamin Diesbach
Stratton R. Heath III
John R. Monsky
John Rachwalski
Micah Meisel
Mark Pinho

Principals
Adam Hahn
Peter Armstrong
Jeffery Mettam
Christopher Williams
Nico Theofanidis
Jennifer Jun

Previous Partners 

 Mark Wolfson
 J Taylor Crandall
 David Brown
 Buford Ray Conley

References

Notes

 Gates Joins a Dream Team Fund
 Bass' Oak Hill II raises $1.3B

External links
 

American companies established in 1986
Financial services companies established in 1986
Private equity firms of the United States
Privately held companies based in Connecticut
Companies based in Stamford, Connecticut